Inside Man is a 2006 American crime film.
 Inside Man: Most Wanted, a 2019 sequel to the film 

Inside Man or The Inside Man may also refer to:

Inside Man (2022 TV series), a 2022 British television series
 The Inside Man (TV series), a 1969 British television series
 Morgan Spurlock Inside Man, an American television series
 Inside Men, a 2012 British television series
 "Inside Man" (Star Trek: Voyager), an episode of Star Trek: Voyager
 "The Inside Man", an episode of NCIS
 "The Inside Man" (Agents of S.H.I.E.L.D.), an episode of Agents of S.H.I.E.L.D.

See also 
 Inside job (disambiguation)